The Bridges at Toko-ri (1953) is a novella by American author James A. Michener.  The book details the experiences of United States Navy pilots in the Korean War as they undertake a mission to destroy heavily protected bridges in enemy territory.

Influences
In 1951, Michener, a former United States Navy officer, was an embedded reporter with the Navy's Task Force 77.

Film adaptation 
The Bridges at Toko-ri was made into a film of the same name and released in 1955 by Paramount Pictures, just two years after the book's publication.  Starring  William Holden and Grace Kelly, it was directed by Mark Robson, who had also brought Return to Paradise, another Michener book, to screen one year earlier. Commander Marshall Beebe who led the Carrier Squadron when Michener was aboard acted as technical adviser to the film and had a cameo role in the film as a pilot.

Further reading 
The book Such Men As These, published in 2010 by David Sears, uses "Michener’s notes to follow the real-life aviators from the day they left home to the truce that ended the war...Sears also follows Michener’s own progress in writing [The Bridges at Toko-ri], which many veterans felt was the best depiction of their experience on the ground and in the sky."

References 

Novels set during the Korean War
1953 American novels
Novels by James A. Michener
Random House books
Aviation novels
United States in the Korean War
American novels adapted into films
Novels set in North Korea